Dictyna alaskae is a species of mesh web weaver in the spider family Dictynidae. It is found in North America, Northern Europe, and Russia (Far East).

References

Dictynidae
Articles created by Qbugbot
Spiders described in 1947